Line 35 / 36 in Kristiansand are two local bus lines in Kristiansand, Norway. They both go from downtown Kristiansand to the Airport Kjevik and Tveit.

Description

35
Line 35 goes from Kristiansand bound for Kjevik - Brattvollshei or Kjevik - Brattvollshei / Grødum at every other hour. This bus collaborate with line 36 from Ve at Tveit. Ve is located after Hamresanden. Line 35 continues to the Airport and Brattvollshei, while 36 continues on Norwegian National Road 41 to Grødum which is just inside of Aust-Agder county and Birkenes municipality.

Rush Hour

36 
Line 36 which normally only goes from Ve to Grødum, goes from Grødum to Kristiansand in the rush hours.

Roads 
The lines uses some notable roads in Kristiansand. The following are:

References 

Transport in Kristiansand
Bus routes in Norway